Glossocarya is a genus of flowering plants in the mint family, Lamiaceae, first described in 1843. It is native to Indochina, Sri Lanka, New Guinea, and Queensland.

Species
Glossocarya calcicola Domin - Queensland
Glossocarya coriacea Munir - Queensland
Glossocarya crenata H.R.Fletcher - Thailand
Glossocarya hemiderma (F.Muell. ex Benth.) Benth. ex B.D.Jacks. - Queensland, New Guinea
Glossocarya longiflora H.R.Fletcher - Thailand
Glossocarya mollis Wall. ex Griff - Myanmar, Thailand, Vietnam, Paluan Rabana in Malaysia
Glossocarya premnoides Ridl. - Thailand, Perlis in Malaysia
Glossocarya puberula Moldenke - Cambodia
Glossocarya scandens (L.f.) Trimen - Sri Lanka
Glossocarya siamensis Craib - Thailand, Vietnam

References

Lamiaceae
Lamiaceae genera